Weny Rasidi (born 9 October 1983; née Rahmawati) is a French badminton player.

Career 

Rahmawati is a former badminton player from Suryanaga Surabaya, Indonesia. She came to France to join the national team as a sparring partner at the age of 18, and also trained at the Chambly club. She won the women's doubles titles in 2005-2008, 2010-2011 and the mixed doubles in 2005 at the French National Championships. She also won the women's doubles title at the 2005 French Open and 2006 Cyprus International. She played the 2007 BWF World Championships in women's singles, and was defeated in the first round by Petya Nedelcheva, of Bulgaria, 21-18, 21-8.

In 2015, she was recruited as a coach at the CLTO Badminton Orléans.

Achievements 
Women's doubles

Mixed doubles

References

External links 
 
 BWF player profile at archive.org

1983 births
Living people
French female badminton players